O Seyeong (born May 2, 1942) is a South Korean poet, critic, educator, and professor at Seoul National University. He has been awarded the Korean Poets’ Association Prize, the Nokwon Literary Award, the Cheong Chi-Yong Literature Prize, the Pyun-Woon Literary Prize, the Gong Cho Literary Award, and the Manhae Literature Prize in Poetry.

Life
O Seyeong was born in Yeonggwang County, South Jeolla Province in 1942. He graduated from Seoul National University, and became a high school language teacher. He started his literary career in 1968 by publishing in the literary magazine Hyundae Munhak. In 1970 he published his first poetry collection, Rebelling Light. In 1972 he was published in the literary magazine Hyundae Poetry. In 1974 he was appointed as a full-time lecturer at Chungnam National University, and graduated with a doctorate degree in Korean literature from Seoul National University in 1980. In 1982 he participated in the inaugural assembly of the Asian Poets’ Association. In 1983 he published two collections of essays, The Lyrical Truth and Modern Poetry and Its Practical Criticism.

In 1987 O Seyeong was awarded the inaugural Sowol Poetry Prize, and was accepted into the IOWA International Writing Program. In 1994 he participated in the writing of a volume on literature as part of the Korean Studies Book Series, Lectures on Korean Literature, published by Story Brook University's Center for Korean Studies. In the same year he became a full professor at Seoul National University. He was a guest lecturer at the University of California, Berkeley in 1995, discussing Korean literature for the Department of East Asian Languages. He was awarded the Manhae Literature Prize in 2000, and published translated versions of two of his poetry collections in Germany. O Seyeong participated in the Berkeley Art Museum's 2006 poetry festival, Speak Pacific: 100 Years of Modern Korean Poetry, sponsored by U.C. Berkeley's Department of East Asian Languages.

O Seyeong's volume Night-Sky Checkerboard was translated into English in 2016, published in the United States and listed by the Chicago Review of Books as one of the twelve best poetry collections of 2016.

Writing
O Seyeong's early works contained significant amounts of "deconstructive" poetry, leading him to be classified as a modernist poet. However, he did not simply stay fixed on linguistic experiments. He gradually became fascinated with Eastern philosophies, and based on that, he worked on lyrical depiction of humanity's existential agony. Through poetry, he shows eternity and infinity, which should be naturally sought after when one is in a state of namelessness. He attempts to show the proper way of life that people with enlightened sense of existence must strive for. ‘Namelessness’ is a Buddhist word that describes a state when the mind has not yet reached intrinsic enlightenment, but rather captured by desires and ego.

Today O Seyeong is described as a poet who has lyrical sense, philosophical intellect, and sophisticated linguistic awareness. He writes as he bores into the double-sidedness and hypocrisy of existence. One of his major works, Bird, depicts birds that soar into the sky toward the truth and freedom, but ultimately must fall, showing humanity's fateful burden. Like how if a poem flies higher, the distance back to the ground get further, this work contains the insight that though humans strive endlessly for the ideal, they are ultimately fatalistic beings that must return to the ground.

The Chicago Review of Books said that O Seyeong's “attention to detail, and his ability to shift back and forth between scopes both grand and minuscule, provide a sense that his poems are inextricably linked to something larger,” noting that his poetry collections “work very much obsessed with existence, the building and destruction of nature, business, war, and industry. He unexpectedly examines merit, plays with worth, while lingering on the edge of past and present.”

Works

Poetry collections
 Rebelling Light (1970)
 The Evening of the Darkest Day (1982) 
 The Soil of Contradiction (1985) 
 Nameless Beginning of the Year (1986)
 The Burning Water (1988) 
 The Other Side of Love (1990) 
 Flowers Long for Stars (1990)
 Darkness Exists Even in God's Heaven (1991) 
 Foolish Hegel! (1994) 
 The Tearful Shadow in the Sky (1994) 
 Because You Are Not There (1997) 
 American Psalms (1997) 
 The Light of Death (2001) 
 Wind's Shadow (2009) 
 Night-Sky Checkerboard (2011)
 Wind's Sons (2014) 
 The Sound of Autumn Rain (2016)

Research papers
 "Study on Romantic Korean Poetry." Il Ji Sa, 1980.  
 "Methodology for Cultural Studies." I-uchulpansa, 1998.  
 "Analytical Reading of Modern Korean Poetry." Korea University Press, 1998. 
 "Study on 20th-Century Korean Poetry." Saemoon Books, 1989. 
 "Theories on Contemporary Korean Literature and Contemporary Poetry." Minumsa, 1996.  
 "Study on Modern Korean Poets." Worin Publishing, 2003.  
 "Theory of Literature." Kookhak, 2003. 
 "Theory of 20th-Century Korean Poets." Worin Publishing, 2005.  
 "Writing Poetry." Seojeongsihak, 2013.  
 "Theory of Poetry." Seojeongsihak, 2013.

Essay collections
 The Lyrical Truth, Minjokmunhwasa, 1983.
 Modern Poetry and Its Practical Criticism, I-uchulpansa, 1983. 
 Where Is Modern Poetry Now?, Jongro Books, 1988. 
 Creativity and Logic, Minumsa, 1991. 
 The Age of Revolution and Modern Korean Poetry, Saemi, 1996.

Works in translation
 Тысячелетний сон (Russian)
 Night-Sky Checkerboard (English)
 Songe de la falaise : Suivi d'un choix de poèmes (French)
 詩集 時間の丸木舟 (Japanese)
 Světlo vyhasnutí (Czech)
 Flowers long for stars (English)
 アントニオ・コレア (Japanese)
 Buja's Diary (English)
 Más allá del amor (Spanish) 
 Sueños del barranco (Spanish)
 Gedichte jenseits der Liebe: Gefäß-Zyklus (German)
 Liebesgedichte eines Unwissenden (German)
 Das ferne Du (German)

Awards
 1983 Korean Poets’ Association Prize
 1984 Nokwon Literary Award for Literary Criticism
 1986 Sowol Poetry Prize 
 1992 Cheong Chi-yong Literature Prize
 1992 Pyun-Woon Literary Prize for Literary Criticism
 2000 Manhae Prize
 2012 Mogwol Literature Prize

References

Further reading 
 Lee Songhoe, “The Cognitive Structure and Conscious Existence in Oh Sae-young’s Poetry”, Haneomungyoyook 24, Association of Korean Literature Education, 2011. 
 O Seyeong, “Reading Oh Sae-young’s First Poetry Collection Again – Fall 2”, Siansa, 2003. 
 Kim Yunjeong, “Study on ‘Mythological Language’ Shown in Oh Sae-young's Poetry”, Academy of Korean Studies, 2006.
 Editors, “Biographies of Poets – Biography of Oh Sae-young”, Jakgasegye 28, 2016.

Living people
1942 births
20th-century South Korean poets
21st-century South Korean poets
South Korean male poets
Society of Korean Poets Award winners
20th-century male writers
21st-century male writers